Thomas "Papa Mutt" Carey (September 17, 1891 – September 3, 1948) was an American jazz trumpeter.

Early life

Carey was born in Hahnville, Louisiana, and moved to New Orleans with his family in his youth. His older brother Jack Carey was a trombone player and bandleader; Mutt was playing cornet in his brother's band by about 1912.

Career 
Although Carey's early work was with brass bands in the New Orleans area (1913–17), in 1914, he started working with Kid Ory and would continue to do so, on and off, through the 1910s.

After touring the vaudeville circuits in 1917, he returned to New Orleans in 1918 and then went to California with Ory in 1919, eventually taking over leadership of the band when Ory left in 1925.

Carey’s big band, the Jeffersonians, appeared in the silent films The Legion of the Condemned and The Road to Ruin (both 1928).

Carey rejoined Ory’s band from around 1929 to 1933, when the lack of work during the Depression led him to work as a Pullman porter.

In March 1944 Carey rejoined Ory in an all-star band that was a leader of the West Coast revival of traditional New Orleans jazz, put together for the CBS Radio series The Orson Welles Almanac. The All Star Jazz Group also included Ed Garland, Jimmie Noone (succeeded by Barney Bigard), Bud Scott, Zutty Singleton and Buster Wilson. Renamed Kid Ory's Creole Jazz Band, the group then made a significant series of recordings on the Crescent Records label.

Carey left Ory's band in 1947 to lead a group under his own name.

Personal life 
Carey died in Lake Elsinore, California, on September 3, 1948, aged 56.

References

External links
 Mutt Carey 1891-1948 at the Red Hot Jazz Archive
 1944 Orson Welles Broadcasts at The Kid Ory Archive
 1945 Jade Palace at The Kid Ory Archive
 Kid Ory's Creole Jazz Band: 1944–1945 The Legendary Crescent Recording Sessions at AllMusic (Scott Yanow)

1891 births
1948 deaths
African-American jazz musicians
American jazz trumpeters
American male trumpeters
Dixieland trumpeters
Jazz musicians from New Orleans
Musicians from Chicago
People from Hahnville, Louisiana
Savoy Records artists
Vaudeville performers
20th-century trumpeters
Jazz musicians from Illinois
20th-century American male musicians
American male jazz musicians
Tuxedo Brass Band members
20th-century African-American musicians